Lautaro Disanto (born 30 May 1998) is an Argentine professional footballer who plays as a forward for Douglas Haig.

Career
Disanto began his career in the ranks of Primera B Nacional's Independiente Rivadavia. His first appearance was his professional debut, he participated for the final twenty-six minutes of a 2–2 draw with Los Andes on 21 May 2017. Disanto scored his first goal a month later during a victory over Chacarita Juniors, in a season which ended with fourteen appearances in all competitions and a fourth-place finish in 2016–17; he signed a contract until 2020 in that campaign.

Career statistics
.

References

External links

1998 births
Living people
Sportspeople from Mendoza, Argentina
Argentine footballers
Association football forwards
Primera Nacional players
Independiente Rivadavia footballers
Villa Mitre footballers
Club Atlético Douglas Haig players